Cathy Mason is a Sinn Féin politician who was elected to the Northern Ireland Assembly from South Down in the 2022 election.

Political career 
Mason has been chairperson of Newry, Mourne and Down District Council since 2021, being elected councillor in 2019.

References 

Living people
Sinn Féin MLAs
Female members of the Northern Ireland Assembly
Northern Ireland MLAs 2022–2027
Women councillors in Northern Ireland
Sinn Féin councillors in Northern Ireland
Year of birth missing (living people)